You've Got to Have a Dream: The Message of the Musical is a book written by the British theologian and Presbyterian minister Ian Bradley, first published in 2004, exploring the spiritual dimension of musical theatre. In his study, Bradley includes works with an overt religious subject matter, for example, Godspell, Jesus Christ Superstar, and Joseph and the Amazing Technicolor Dreamcoat as well looking at musicals such as Les Misérables, The Lion King, and Carousel. His thesis is that churches have a great deal to learn from modern musicals and could usefully incorporate their spiritual and theological values, and the pastoral care they offer, into their services.

The title You've Got to Have a Dream is a reference to a line in the popular song "Happy Talk" in the Rodgers & Hammerstein musical South Pacific.

Published in September 2004, the book predates the protests and controversy surrounding the BBC broadcast of Jerry Springer: The Opera in January 2005, which was strongly opposed by organisations such as Christian Voice and the Christian Institute, which attempted to bring a private prosecution against the BBC.

References

External links

 BBC - Songs of Praise - Video

2004 books
Books about Christianity
Christianity in popular culture
Non-fiction books about musical theatre
Practical theology
SCM Press books